Taylor Memorial may refer to the following:

Buildings and structures
Bayard Taylor Memorial Library in Kennett Square, Pennsylvania
M. Harvey Taylor Memorial Bridge in Harrisburg, Pennsylvania
Taylor Memorial Arboretum in Wallingford, Pennsylvania
Taylor Memorial Bridge in Hudson, Massachusetts
Taylor Memorial Chapel in Black Forest, Colorado
Taylor Memorial Institute in Toowoomba, Queensland, Australia
Taylor Memorial Library in Milford, Connecticut

Events
Noel J Taylor Memorial Mile, a Group I horse race in New Zealand